Linda Joy Duffield  (born 18 April 1953) is a British former diplomat who was chief executive of the Westminster Foundation for Democracy 2009–14.

Career
Duffield was educated at St. Mary's Grammar School for Girls in Northwood Hills, now merged into Haydon School, and Exeter University where she graduated in 1975. She worked in the DHSS 1976–85, then studied at the École nationale d'administration in Paris 1985–86 and joined the Foreign and Commonwealth Office (FCO) in 1987. She was posted to Moscow 1989–92, and was deputy High Commissioner at Ottawa 1995–99. She was High Commissioner to Sri Lanka, and concurrently High Commissioner to the Maldives, 1999–2002. She returned to the FCO as director of the Wider Europe department 2002–04, then served as ambassador to the Czech Republic 2004–09. She was appointed chief executive of the Westminster Foundation for Democracy (a body sponsored by the FCO) 2009–14.

Duffield was appointed CMG in the 2002 New Year Honours.

References

1953 births
Living people
People educated at Haydon School
Alumni of the University of Exeter
Civil servants in the Department of Health and Social Security
École nationale d'administration alumni
High Commissioners of the United Kingdom to Sri Lanka
High Commissioners of the United Kingdom to the Maldives
Ambassadors of the United Kingdom to the Czech Republic
Companions of the Order of St Michael and St George
British women ambassadors